O Brother, Where Art Thou? or variants may refer to:

 O Brother, Where Art Thou?, 2000 film written, produced, co-edited and directed by Joel and Ethan Coen
 O Brother, Where Art Thou? (soundtrack), soundtrack of the film
 "Oh Brother, Where Art Thou?", 1991 episode of the television series The Simpsons
 "O Brother, Where Bart Thou?", 2009 episode of The Simpsons
 "O Brother, Where Art Thou?" (Supergirl), episode of the television series Supergirl